Derimod is a Turkish leather goods producer and retailer, with stores in the US as well as in Turkey.

History
The company was founded in 1974. Today Derimod manufactures leather clothing,  and accessories. The company also operates 81 retail stores selling its own brands plus goods from other manufacturers in Turkey's biggest shopping centres, such as Akmerkez and Istinye Park.

References

 https://www.derimod.com.tr/hakkimizda
 https://www.kap.org.tr/tr/sirket-bilgileri/ozet/915-derimod-konfeksiyon-ayakkabi-deri-sanayi-ve-ticaret-a-s

External links
 Derimod.com.tr

Companies based in Istanbul
Clothing brands of Turkey
Clothing companies of Turkey
Turkish brands
Turkish companies established in 1974
Clothing companies established in 1974